In financial mathematics (concerned with mathematical modeling of financial markets), the entropic risk measure is a risk measure which depends on the risk aversion of the user through the exponential utility function.  It is a possible alternative to other risk measures as value-at-risk or expected shortfall.

It is a theoretically interesting measure because it provides different risk values for different individuals whose attitudes toward risk may differ. However, in practice it would be difficult to use since quantifying the risk aversion for an individual is difficult to do.  The entropic risk measure is the prime example of a convex risk measure which is not coherent.  Given the connection to utility functions, it can be used in utility maximization problems.

Mathematical definition
The entropic risk measure with the risk aversion parameter  is defined as
 
where  is the relative entropy of Q << P.

Acceptance set
The acceptance set for the entropic risk measure is the set of payoffs with positive expected utility.  That is
 
where  is the exponential utility function.

Dynamic entropic risk measure
The conditional risk measure associated with dynamic entropic risk with risk aversion parameter  is given by

This is a time consistent risk measure if  is constant through time,
 and can be computed efficiently using forward-backwards differential equations

.

See also 
 Entropic value at risk
 List of financial performance measures

References

Financial risk modeling
Utility